The Dubliner Challenge was a one-off golf tournament on the Challenge Tour that was played in 2008 at Hills Golf Club in Gothenburg, Sweden. It was won by Denmark's Mark Haastrup. Due to rain, the tournament was shortened to 54 holes.

Winners

Notes

References

External links
Coverage on the Challenge Tour's official site

Former Challenge Tour events
Golf tournaments in Sweden